Malmea is a genus of plant in family Annonaceae. It contains the following species (but this list may be incomplete):
 Malmea cuspidata, Diels

References

Annonaceae
Annonaceae genera
Taxonomy articles created by Polbot